Hidden Frontier may refer to:
 The Hidden Frontier, a 1974 ethnographic study
 Star Trek: Hidden Frontier, Star Trek fan film project